The 1879 Victoria v South Australia involved a series of two matches with teams representing Victoria and South Australia. The matches were played in Victoria at the East Melbourne Cricket Ground. These two matches are recognised as the first games of intercolonial Australian rules football.

Game 1 (July 1)

Teams 
Some players selected in the initial squad for South Australia were unable to make the trip to Victoria for the series. These players included Thomas Smith from Port Adelaide, A. Mehrtens from South Adelaide, W.H.J. Dedman from Norwood, W. Knill, W. Osborn, C.E. Warren from Victorians.

 Victoria def. South Australia (7 – 0).
 Venue – East Melbourne Cricket Ground. 
 Attendance – 10,000. 
Umpire – Jas. Slight.

Game 2 (July 5) 
The second game was played under the rules of the South Australia Football Association which were almost identical to that of the Victorian Football Association but for the allowance of high tackles.

 Result – Victoria def. South Australia (4–1).
Venue – East Melbourne Cricket Ground
Attendance – 8,000
Umpire – Jas. Slight.

References

1879 in Australian rules football
Australian rules football games